San Maria di Ciciliano is a Roman Catholic church located in the town of Montecastrilli, in the province of Terni, region of Umbria, Italy.

History
A church was present at the site by the 11th century and located within the castle of Cicigliano. It was once dependant to the Abbey of Farfa. It was transferred to an order of nuns in 1779.

References

Churches in the province of Terni
11th-century Roman Catholic church buildings in Italy